Loïc (Loiic, Loick) is a Bretish male given name.

Loic may also refer to:

 Low Orbit Ion Cannon, an open-source networking testing application
 An alternate dialectal pronunciation spelling of like

See also

 
 Loich, Austria
 Dun Loich, Ireland
 Loik (disambiguation)
 Lois (disambiguation)